Sarcophila is a genus of true flies in the family Sarcophagidae.

Species
S. botnariuci Lehrer & Oprisan, 2011
S. canaanita Lehrer, 2007
S. dayanella Lehrer, 2003
S. japonica (Rohdendorf, 1962)
S. latifrons (Fallén, 1817)
S. meridionalis Rohdendorf & Verves, 1985
S. meridionalis Verves, 1982
S. mongolica Chao & Zhang, 1988
S. monteora Lehrer & Oprisan, 2011
S. nawara Lehrer, 2003
S. olsufjevi Verves, 1982
S. rasnitzyni Verves, 1982
S. turanica Verves, 1982

References 

Sarcophagidae
Schizophora genera
Taxa named by Camillo Rondani